Should We Get Married? (German: Soll man heiraten?) is a 1925 German silent film directed by Manfred Noa and starring Vilma Bánky, Angelo Ferrari and Max Landa.

The film's art direction was by Hermann Warm.

Cast
In alphabetical order
 Vilma Bánky
 Angelo Ferrari 
 Max Landa 
 Toni Tetzlaff 
 Olga Tschechowa
 Ludwig Ujvari

References

Bibliography
 Schildgen, Rachel A. More Than A Dream: Rediscovering the Life and Films of Vilma Banky. 1921 PVG Publishing, 2010.

External links

1925 films
Films of the Weimar Republic
Films directed by Manfred Noa
German silent feature films
UFA GmbH films
German black-and-white films